This list of molybdenum mines is subsidiary to the list of mines article and lists working, defunct and planned mines that have substantial molybdenum output, organized by country.

North America

Canada

United States

Europe

Asia

Armenia

China

South West Pacific

Papua New Guinea

Australia

References

Molybdenum mines